During the 1892–93 season Hearts competed in the Scottish Football League, the Scottish Cup and the East of Scotland Shield.

Fixtures

East of Scotland Shield

Rosebery Charity Cup

Scottish Cup

Scottish Football League

See also
List of Heart of Midlothian F.C. seasons

References

Statistical Record 92-93

External links
Official Club website

Heart of Midlothian F.C. seasons
Heart of Midlothian